Rashchupkin or Raschupkin is a Russian masculine surname, its feminine counterpart is Rashchupkina or Raschupkina. Notable people with the surname include:

Viktor Rashchupkin (born 1950), Russian discus thrower

Russian-language surnames